This is the order of battle for Operation Epsom, a Second World War battle between British and German forces in Normandy, France between 26 June and 30 June 1944.

British Order of Battle
Second Army
General Officer Commanding-in-Chief Lieutenant-General Miles Dempsey'German Order of Battle

Seventh Army / Panzer Group West
General Friedrich Dollmann (until 1700 hours 28 June) 
General der Panzertruppe (General of Armoured Troops) Leo Geyr von Schweppenburg (from 1700 hours 28 June)

Army Troops
 Projector Brigade 7
 Projector Brigade 8

I SS Panzer Corps
SS-Obergruppenführer Sepp Dietrich
 Corps Troops
 Heavy SS Panzer Battalion 101 - SS-Obersturmbannführer Heinz von Westerhagen
 SS-Artillery Battalion 101
 Artillery Battalion 992
 12th SS Panzer Division Hitlerjugend - SS-Standartenführer Kurt Meyer
 SS-Panzer Regiment 12
 SS-Panzergrenadier Regiment 25
 SS-Panzergrenadier Regiment 26
 SS-Panzer Artillery Regiment 12
 SS-Reconnaissance Battalion 12
 SS-Anti-Tank Battalion 12
 SS-Projector Battalion 12
 SS-Anti-Aircraft Battalion 12
 SS-Panzer Pioneer Battalion 12
 1st SS Panzer Division Leibstandarte SS Adolf Hitler - SS-Obersturmbannführer Albert Frey
 battlegroup Frey
 SS-Panzergrenadier Regiment 3 (elements)
 SS-Panzergrenadier Regiment 4 (elements)
 21st Panzer Division - Generalmajor Edgar Feuchtinger
 One battlegroup
 Panzer-Lehr-Division (elements) - Generalleutnant Fritz Bayerlein
 2nd SS Panzer Division Das Reich - SS-Obersturmbannführer Otto Weidinger
 Battlegroup Weidinger
 1st Battalion, 4th SS Panzer-Grenadier Regiment "Der Führer"
 14th, 15th and 16th (Support) Companies, 4th SS Panzer-Grenadier Regiment "Der Führer"
 1st Battalion, 3rd SS Panzer-Grenadier Regiment "Deutschland"

II SS Panzer Corps
SS-Obergruppenführer Paul Hausser (until morning of 29 June)
SS-Obergruppenführer Willi Bittrich (from morning of 29 June)
 9th SS Panzer Division Hohenstaufen - SS-Standartenführer Thomas Müller
 SS-Panzer Regiment 9
 SS-Panzergrenadier Regiment 19
 SS-Panzergrenadier Regiment 20
 SS-Panzer Artillery Regiment 9
 SS-Reconnaissance Battalion 9
 SS-Anti-Tank Battalion 9
 SS-Anti-Aircraft Battalion 9
 SS-Panzer Pioneer Battalion 9
 10th SS Panzer Division Frundsberg - SS-Oberführer Heinz Harmel
 SS-Panzer Regiment 10
 SS-Panzergrenadier Regiment 21
 SS-Panzergrenadier Regiment 22
 SS-Panzer Artillery Regiment 10
 SS-Reconnaissance Battalion 10
 SS-Anti-Aircraft Battalion 10
 SS-Panzer Pioneer Battalion 10

III Anti-Aircraft Corps
 General der Flakartillerie Wolfgang Pickert
 4th Anti-Aircraft Regiment (88mm Anti-Aircraft and other guns)

XLVII Panzer Corps
 2nd Panzer Division (elements)
 One battlegroup based around a tank battalion

See also

 List of orders of battle

Notes
Footnotes

Citations

References
 
 Richard Doherty, Hobart's 79th Armoured Division at War: Invention, Innovation and Inspiration, Barnsley: Pen & Sword, 2011, ISBN 978-1-84884-398-1.
 
 Maj-Gen H. Essame, The 43rd Wessex Division at War 1944–45, London: William Clowes, 1952.
 
 
 
 
 
 Lt-Col H.F. Joslen, Orders of Battle, United Kingdom and Colonial Formations and Units in the Second World War, 1939–1945, London: HM Stationery Office, 1960/Uckfield: Naval & Military Press, 2003, ISBN 1-843424-74-6.
 Lt-Gen H.G. Martin, The History of the Fifteenth Scottish Division 1939–1945, Edinburgh: Blackwood, 1948/Uckfield: Naval & Military Press, 2014, ISBN 978-1-78331-085-2.
 
 Capt the Earl of Rosse & Col E.R. Hill, The Story of the Guards Armoured Division, London: Geoffrey Bles, 1956/Barnsley: Pen & Sword, 2017, ISBN 978-1-52670-043-8.
 Tim Saunders, Battleground Europe: Operation Epsom: Normandy, June 1944, Barnsley: Pen & Sword, 2003, ISBN 0-85052-954-9.
 
 Don Neal, Guns and Bugles: The Story of the 6th Bn KSLI – 181st Field Regiment RA 1940–1946'', Studley: Brewin, 2001, .
 
 
 
 
 

Epsom, Operation
Epsom, Operation
Epsom
Epsom, Operation